Sophie Gustafson (born 27 December 1973) is a Swedish professional golfer. She was a member of the U.S.-based LPGA Tour and is a life member of the Ladies European Tour (LET). She has five LPGA Tour and 23 international wins in her career, including victories on five of the six continents on which golf is played: North America, Europe, Australia, Africa and Asia. She is a four-time LET Order of Merit winner and represented Europe in the Solheim Cup on each team from 1998 to 2011. She won the Women's British Open in 2000, the year before it was recognized as a major championship by the LPGA Tour and finished runner-up in 2005 and 2006.

Early life
Gustafson grew up in Särö, outside Kungsbacka on the west coast of Sweden. At young ages, she practiced many different sports with her two elder brothers – football, tennis, table tennis, ice hockey, sailing and figure skating. When she was ten years old, a 9-hole golf course was built close to her home and Gustafson and her family began playing. At 14 years of age, she quit other sports, to concentrate on golf and got the opportunity to represent nearby situated Kungsbacka Golf Club, with 27 holes and better practice facilities. Showing great talent, she turned  professional at 18 years of age in 1992, whilst studying marketing, economics and law at Aranäs High School in Kungsbacka. In 1993 she won the Swedish Junior Match-play Championship, which at the time, due to Sweden's "open golf"-policy was not restricted to amateurs only, but it was whiteout prize-money and unique that it was won by a young professional.

Professional career
From  1992 to 1994, Gustafson played 12 Telia Tour and four Ladies European Tour tournaments. On the Telia Tour, she had six top-10 finishes. Her best finish on the Ladies European Tour was a 22nd at her home tournament in Sweden.

1995 saw her join the Ladies European Tour gaining two top-10 finishes in 13 starts. 1996 was her first full year on the Ladies European Tour. She gained her first professional wins, winning once on the Telia Tour at the Rörstrand Ladies Open and once on the Ladies European Tour at the Déesse Ladies Swiss Open. In 1997 she earned her first win on the Ladies Asian Tour at the Thailand Ladies Open and  finished T40th at LPGA Q School to earn non-exempt status for 1998.

In 1998 Gustafson won twice on the LET at the Donegal Irish Ladies' Open and at the Marrakech Palmeraie Open, finish second on the Order of Merit and was voted Waterford Players' Player of the Year. She also played four times on the LPGA Tour, recording a second-place finish at the co-sanctioned Women's British Open. She also won the Telia Tour Finale  and made her debut in the Solheim Cup, replacing the injured Trish Johnson at the last minute. During 1999, Gustafson played on both the LPGA and Ladies European Tours. Her best result was a tie for second at the Ladies' German Open on the Ladies European Tour.

2000 was a breakthrough year for Gustafson. She got her maiden win on the LPGA Tour at the Chick-fil-A Charity Championship, and added a second LPGA title at the co-sanctioned Women’s British Open. She had two other wins in Europe at the Ladies Italian Open and at the Waterford Crystal Ladies' Irish Open, and partnered with Carin Koch to win the inaugural TSN Ladies World Cup Golf. She also won 2 and a half out of a possible four points in Europe's Solheim Cup victory at Loch Lomond.  The year ended with Gustafson topping the Evian Order of Merit and official Evian moneylist, being voted Swedish Player of the Year by the Association of Swedish Golf Writers and becoming Players' Player of Year'.

In 2001 Gustafson won once on both the LPGA Tour at the Subaru Memorial of Naples and Ladies European Tour at the AAMI Women's Australian Open crossing the LPGA Tour career $1million earnings mark. The defence of her LPGA title ended with her losing in a playoff to Annika Sörenstam. In 2002, she played seven LET events, posting four top-10 finishes, ending the season with one victory at the Biarritz Ladies Classic and third place in the Order of Merit as well as winning the Vivien Saunders Stroke average trophy. She made 15 of 20 cuts on the LPGA, with her best finish an 11th.

In 2003, she won three out of eight LET events and secured another LET Order of Merit title. She also won her third LET Players' Player of the Year award and the Vivien Saunders Stroke Average trophy. She won the Samsung World Championship on the LPGA tour, her 4th LPGA win, crossing the $2million LPGA Tour career earnings mark. She became the first woman to compete in a men's Japan Golf Tour event, and was part of the winning European Solheim Cup team in her native Sweden.

During 2004 Gustafson struggled with illness due to deep vein thrombosis in her leg. Her best finish of the year was a tie for third on the LPGA tour where she led the tour in driving distance at 270.2 yards. At the start of 2005, Gustafson represented Sweden with Carin Koch in the 2005 Women's World Cup of Golf in SA. Three LET events in 2005 yielded a second-place finish at the Weetabix Women's British Open and 3rd place on the LET Money List. On the LPGA Tour she had seven top 10 finishes and tied her career low round of 64 at the Wendy's Championship for Children. Gustafson made her 5th appearance in the Solheim Cup. and was a member of the International Team in the inaugural Lexus Cup.

In 2006 Gustafson played in just three LET events but finished fourth on the New Star Money List after claiming her first victory in almost three years at the Siemens Austrian Ladies Golf Open at Golfclub Fohrenwald in Wiener Neustadt in Austria. This win gave her the point she needed to become a Life Member of the LET. She earned her thirteenth LET win in 2007 at the De Vere Ladies Scottish Open.

Gustafson was a member of the European Solheim Cup team in 1998, 2000, 2002, 2003, 2005, 2007, 2009 and 2011.

Personal life
In 2006, Gustafson married former LPGA commissioner Ty Votaw, who left his post following the 2005 Solheim Cup. They divorced in January 2010.

Gustafson, in her words, has a "severe stuttering problem" and rarely speaks to the media. During the 2011 Solheim Cup she made an exception and spoke on-camera with Golf Channel.

During her LPGA Tour career, she lived in Orlando, Florida. After retiring, she moved back to Särö, Sweden.

Since 2015, Gustafson only played in a few tournaments. Instead she begun a career as a caddie for LET player Beth Allen. They parted ways after the U.S. Women's Open in July 2017.

Gustafson is interested in driving motorcycle.

Amateur wins
1993 Swedish Junior Match-play Champiponship

Professional wins (26)

LPGA Tour wins (5)

LPGA Tour playoff record (0–4)

Ladies European Tour wins (16)

Ladies European Tour playoff record (4–1)

Note: Gustafson won the Weetabix Women's British Open once before it was recognized as a major championship on the LPGA Tour in 2001.

Notes:
1 Co-sanctioned by LPGA Tour and Ladies European Tour
2 Co-sanctioned by ALPG Tour and Ladies European Tour

Swedish Golf Tour wins (2)
1996 Rörstrand Ladies Open
1998 Telia Ladies Finale

Other wins (4)
1997 Thailand Ladies Open (Ladies Asian Tour)
1998 Lalla Meryem Cup (Morocco)
2000 TSN Ladies World Cup Golf (team event with Carin Koch)
2003 Catalonia World Matchplay Championship

Results in LPGA majors
Results not in chronological order before 2014.

^ The Women's British Open replaced the du Maurier Classic as an LPGA major in 2001
^^ The Evian Championship was added as a major in 2013

CUT = missed the half-way cut
"T" = tied

Summary

Most consecutive cuts made – 7 (1999 Kraft Nabisco – 2001 Kraft Nabisco)
Longest streak of top-10s – 2 (2006 U.S. Open – 2006 British Open)

LPGA Tour career summary

 official through 23 November 2014

Team appearances
Professional
Praia d'El Rey European Cup (representing  Ladies European Tour): 1998 (tie), 1999 (winners)
Solheim Cup (representing Europe): 1998, 2000 (winners), 2002, 2003 (winners), 2005, 2007, 2009, 2011 (winners)
Lexus Cup (representing International team): 2005 (winners)
World Cup (representing Sweden): 2005, 2008
European Nations Cup (representing Sweden): 2010 (winners), 2011 (winners)

Solheim Cup record

See also
List of golfers with most Ladies European Tour wins

References

External links

Swedish female golfers
Ladies European Tour golfers
LPGA Tour golfers
Solheim Cup competitors for Europe
Golfers from Orlando, Florida
Sportspeople from Halland County
People from Varberg
People from Ponte Vedra Beach, Florida
1973 births
Living people